Andrei Dragoș Șerban (born 31 October 2000) is a Romanian professional footballer who plays as a midfielder for Liga I side Chindia Târgoviște.

Career Statistics

Club

Honours
Chindia Târgoviște
 Liga II: 2018–19

References

External links
 
 

2000 births
Living people
Sportspeople from Târgoviște
Romanian footballers
Association football midfielders
Liga I players
Liga II players
Liga III players
CS Național Sebiș players
AFC Chindia Târgoviște players